The Alex Awards annually recognize "ten books written for adults that have special appeal to young adults ages 12 through 18". Essentially, the award is a listing by the American Library Association parallel to its annual Best Books for Young Adults, a longer list of recommended books that have been promoted in the YA category. Since 2002, the Alex Awards have been administered by the Young Adult Library Services Association (YALSA), a division of the American Library Association (ALA). YALSA also names several other "Top Tens" annually.

The awards, named after Baltimore librarian Margaret Alexander Edwards, who was known as "Alex," are sponsored by the Margaret Alexander Edwards Trust and Booklist magazine. The list of books published during the previous year serves to provide the choice of titles selected for the awards, which were initially bestowed in 1998.

Alex recipients

References

External links
 Alex Awards Home Page

1998 establishments in the United States
American Library Association awards
American literary awards
Awards established in 1998
English-language literary awards
Young adult literature awards